Wadena is a town in the Canadian province of Saskatchewan, located east of Saskatoon, north of Fort Qu'Appelle and northwest of Yorkton on the eastern shore of the Quill Lakes. The town is known for its birdwatching and hunting opportunities as Quill Lakes is part of a major flight path. The Wadena and District Museum, located just south of Wadena on Highway 35, also hosts an annual Vintage Day in July.

Wadena is the administrative centre of the Rural Municipality of Lakeview. It is also the administrative headquarters of the Fishing Lake Saulteaux First Nation band government.

The town is named after Wadena, Minnesota, the place of origin of some early settlers of Scandinavian American descent. The town in Minnesota was in turn named after a Chippewa/Saulteaux Chief.

Demographics 
In the 2011 Canada Census conducted by Statistics Canada, Wadena's population was 1,306 living within 2.91 square kilometers (1.12 square miles), for a population density of 449.5/sq km (1,166.8/sq mi).

Notable people
 Pamela Wallin – Canadian radio and television personality, senator
 Keith Magnuson – player, team captain and coach of the NHL's Chicago Black Hawks, born and grew up in Wadena
 General Wayne Eyre
 Leonard Lee – founder of Lee Valley Tools, born in Algrove

See also
 List of communities in Saskatchewan
List of place names in Canada of Indigenous origin
 List of towns in Saskatchewan

References

External links

Lakeview No. 337, Saskatchewan
Towns in Saskatchewan
Division No. 10, Saskatchewan